Damion Alexis McIntosh (born March 25, 1977, in Kingston, Jamaica) is a former American football offensive tackle. He was drafted by the San Diego Chargers in the third round of the 2000 NFL Draft. He played college football at Kansas State.

McIntosh also played for the Miami Dolphins and Kansas City Chiefs.

Early years
McIntosh played for McArthur High School in Hollywood, Florida.  His senior year, the McArthur team went 9-1, winning the district championship and ending the regular season ranked in the top 5 of the Florida High School Athletic Association 5A Poll.  Numerous of Damion's high school teammates went on to play in the collegiate ranks or professional ranks, including Anthony Kelly (Central Oklahoma), Brian Visalli (Concordia University- Wisc.), Dan Visalli (Holy Cross), Quentin Chandler (Cen. Conn.), Mike Jaeger (Mount Scenario), Tyrone Taylor and Jerome Taylor (University of Missouri), Jason Brown (Gettysburg), Wayne Smith (App State, CFL), among others.

Professional career

San Diego Chargers
He was drafted in the third round of the 2000 NFL Draft by the San Diego Chargers. He played four season with the Chargers.

Miami Dolphins
On March 12, 2004 the Miami Dolphins signed McIntosh to a six-year, $23 million contract.

Kansas City Chiefs
McIntosh played for the Kansas City Chiefs from 2007 to 2008.  He was cut by the Chiefs in September 2009.

Seattle Seahawks
McIntosh was signed by the Seattle Seahawks on October 13, 2009.

References

1977 births
Living people
Sportspeople from Kingston, Jamaica
American football offensive tackles
Kansas State Wildcats football players
San Diego Chargers players
Miami Dolphins players
Kansas City Chiefs players
Seattle Seahawks players